Identify is the debut studio album by South Korean boy band Got7. It was released on November 18, 2014. The song "하지하지마 (Stop Stop It)" was used to promote the album.

Track listing

Chart performance

Album chart

Singles
Stop Stop It

Sales

References 

2014 albums
Got7 albums
JYP Entertainment albums
Genie Music albums
Korean-language albums